Apt. 3 is a 1971 children's picture book by American author and illustrator Ezra Jack Keats. It was published in 1971 by The Macmillan Company.

Plot
The sound of a harmonica floats through the halls of Sam and Ben's tenement. The sweet melodies inspire the brothers to explore the building, which is filled with the sounds and smells of a diverse city. Finally, the brothers find the source of the beautiful music, along with a blind man who “sees” with his ears, and the search ends in a new friendship.

Film
In 1979, the film, narrated by Charles Turner, was released.

References

Books by Ezra Jack Keats
1971 children's books
American picture books
African-Americans in literature
Harmonica